Jan Novák (born April 4, 1953, in Kolín) is a Czech-American writer, screenwriter and playwright.  He writes in both Czech and English, frequently translating his work. He has received awards in both the United States and the Czech Republic. He has worked closely with such figures as Václav Havel and Miloš Forman.

Early life and education
His family fled Czechoslovakia in 1969, after his father was discovered to have committed embezzlement.  They escaped to a refugee camp in Austria, where after corresponding with members of the large Czech-American community in Chicago, they were able to emigrate to Cicero, Illinois. After high school, he initially attended Shimer College, a small Great Books college then located in Mount Carroll.  He subsequently attended and graduated from the University of Chicago, receiving bachelor's and master's degrees.

Literary career
Novák's first published story was the winning entry in a short-story contest by the University of Chicago Maroon, which he originally wrote in Czech and then translated into English.  The story caught the attention of Czech-American publisher Josef Škvorecký, who published Novák's debut collection of short stories, Striptease Chicago. The stories in the collection depict the lives of Czech immigrants in America with an ironic sensibility. The stories also showed a propensity for Czenglish, a mixing of the Czech and English languages. His other works in this period were written solely in English.

His 1985 novel The Willys Dream Kit, draws on family experience and depicts his father's life story from his youth during the Nazi occupation to death in the USA. It was very favorably received, winning the Carl Sandburg Award for Chicago authors and the Friends of Literature Award.  The foreword to the Czech edition was written by Václav Havel.  His second novel The Grand Life (Poseidon Press, 1987), again partly inspired by his own experiences (the hero is a middle manager at a Chicago energy company), was however not a commercial success.

Venturing into nonfiction, his 1992 book Prague in Velvet recounts Novák's visit to Prague in November 1989, shortly after the Velvet Revolution. Commies, Crooks, Gypsies, Spooks and Poets (1995) recounts a year-long vacation to Prague in 1992–3.  It received the Carl Sandburg Literary Award for non-fiction in 1995.

Novák's So Far So Good, an extensive literary treatment of the story of the Mašín brothers who escaped to West Berlin in 1953, and originally written in English (but never published), was translated into Czech and as "Zatím dobrý" won the Magnesia Litera award for book of the year in 2005.  In 2009 he published a book of interviews titled Under Water (Franz Kafka Publishing House), containing personal interviews with Miloš Forman, Dominik Hašek, Lubomír Kaválka, Antonín Kratochvíl, and Josef Mašín.

Film career

As a screenwriter, Novák worked with Miloš Forman on the film Valmont, and in the 1990s he wrote the script for the Czech film Báječná léta pod psa ("The Blissful Years of Lousy Living") and participated in the scenarios An ambiguous report about the end of the world. He is also co-author of Forman's autobiography called What Do I Know? (Turnaround, 1994; translation Josek George, Atlantis 1994).

He has made two documentary films about Václav Havel.  In 2005 he made the documentary Citizen Václav Havel Goes on Vacation together with his son Adam, recounting a vacation taken by Havel in 1985 that led to a massive police chase.  This was followed in 2009 by the film Citizen Havel is Rolling the Empty Barrels, an adaptation of Havel's play "Audience".

As of 2009, he was a member of the faculty at the Film and TV School of the Academy of Performing Arts in Prague.

Dramaturgical career
Novák's first play was "Bohemian Heaven," which opened at the Provincetown Playhouse in 1980; it paints a semi-autobiographical portrait of a newly arrived Czech immigrant family in Cicero, Illinois.

His play "Alaska," originally commissioned for Chicago's Goodman Theater, was performed in Brno in 1994.  In 2000, the Astorka theater in Bratislava, Slovakia, performed his "A Murder in St. Petersburg," a dramatic adaptation of the ax murder in Fyodor Dostoevsky's Crime and Punishment.  A collection of his plays has been published in Czech.

Novák also translated into English Václav Havel's play Audience, Unveiling, Protest and The Garden Party (alternatively titled Office Party). His one-act plays were published in 2009 in a bilingual edition under the title "Citizen Vanek / Vanek Citizen ".  They were published in the U. S. in 2012 by Theater 61 Press under the title "The Vanek Plays", which edition also included Novák's translation of Havel's modern Vanek sequel, Dozens of Cousins.

References

External links

Radio Prague interview
Bio of Jan Novák

Living people
1953 births
20th-century Czech novelists
Czech male novelists
20th-century Czech dramatists and playwrights
Czech male dramatists and playwrights
Czech screenwriters
Male screenwriters
Magnesia Litera winners
University of Chicago alumni
Shimer College alumni
Czechoslovak emigrants to the United States
Writers from Kolín